2nd Reserve Division() was formed in August 1955 in Chengdu Military Region. On February 15, 1956, the division moved to Chongqing, Sichuan. As of its activation the division was composed of:
4th Reserve Regiment;
5th Reserve Regiment;
6th Reserve Regiment;
Artillery Regiment;
Anti-Aircraft Artillery Regiment;
Sergeant Training Regiment.

The division was fully manned and equipped. During its short-lived existence the division was focused on the training of officers and sergeants. In March 1958, the division was disbanded.

References

 

R2
Military units and formations established in 1955
Military units and formations disestablished in 1958
Reserve divisions of the People's Liberation Army